Magnús Þór Gunnarsson (born 7 February 1981) is an Icelandic basketball player who played twenty seasons in the Úrvalsdeild karla. He won the Icelandic championship five times and the Icelandic basketball cup three times.

Icelandic national team
Magnús played 77 games for the Icelandic national basketball team from 2001 to 2013, and was for a time the team's captain.

Controversies
On February 24, 2014, in a game between Keflavík and KR, Magnús elbowed KR's Brynjar Þór Björnsson in the face and as a result received a one-game suspension. On November 6, the same year, he once again struck against Brynjar while he was driving to the basket, sending him flying out of bounds. Magnús was ejected from the game and later received a two-game suspension.

Coaching career
On 28 August 2018, Magnús was hired as an assistant coach to Jón Guðmundsson of Úrvalsdeild kvenna club Keflavík. On 30 September 2018, he won the Icelandic Women's Super Cup with Keflavík.

Titles and awards

Titles
5x Icelandic champion (1999, 2003–2005, 2008)
3× Icelandic Basketball Cup (2003, 2004, 2012)
Icelandic Supercup (2003)
3x Icelandic Company Cup (2002, 2006, 2013)

Awards
3x Úrvalsdeild Domestic All-First Team (2005, 2006, 2012)

References

External links
Úrvalsdeild statistics 1998-2007
Icelandic statistics 2008-present
Eurobasket profile

1981 births
Living people
Magnus Thor Gunnarsson
Guards (basketball)
Magnus Thor Gunnarsson
Magnus Thor Gunnarsson
Magnus Thor Gunnarsson
Magnus Thor Gunnarsson
Magnus Thor Gunnarsson
Magnus Thor Gunnarsson
Magnus Thor Gunnarsson
Magnus Thor Gunnarsson
Magnus Thor Gunnarsson